Small cap may refer to:

 Market capitalization
 Small cap company, a company whose market capitalization is under $1 billion
 Small capital letter

See also
 Small Cap Liquidity Reform Act of 2013
 Small capitalism or small business